Him and His Sister is a Czech comedy film directed by Karel Lamač and Martin Frič. It was released in 1931.

Cast
 Vlasta Burian as Jarda Brabec
 Anny Ondra as Anny Brabcová, jeho sestra
 Otto Rubík as Bernard
 Olga Augustová as Sabina Veldenová, subreta
 Jan Sviták as Burda, prítel Sabiny
 Theodor Pištěk as Ministr post

References

External links
 

1931 films
1931 comedy films
1930s Czech-language films
Czechoslovak black-and-white films
Films directed by Martin Frič
Films directed by Karel Lamač
Czech films based on plays
Czechoslovak multilingual films
Czechoslovak comedy films
1931 multilingual films
1930s Czech films